Jan Chvojka (born 17 December 1980) is a Czech politician who was a Member of the Chamber of Deputies (MP) from 2017 to 2021 and from December 2016 to December 2017 Minister for Human Rights.

References

External links
Profile on the website of ČSSD
Profile on the website of Parliament

1980 births
Living people
People from Hlinsko
Czech Social Democratic Party Government ministers
Czech Social Democratic Party MPs
Government ministers of the Czech Republic
Charles University alumni
Masaryk University alumni
Members of the Chamber of Deputies of the Czech Republic (2010–2013)
Members of the Chamber of Deputies of the Czech Republic (2013–2017)
Members of the Chamber of Deputies of the Czech Republic (2017–2021)